Hasiv Abu Rukon (born 11 February 1991) is an Israeli footballer currently playing for Ihud Bnei Shefa-'Amr.

References

External links
 

1991 births
Living people
Arab citizens of Israel
Israeli footballers
Maccabi Haifa F.C. players
Maccabi Netanya F.C. players
Maccabi Ironi Bat Yam F.C. players
Bnei Sakhnin F.C. players
Hapoel Afula F.C. players
Ihud Bnei Majd al-Krum F.C. players
Maccabi Ironi Kiryat Ata F.C. players
Maccabi Daliyat al-Karmel F.C. players
Hapoel Ironi Baqa al-Gharbiyye F.C. players
Hapoel Asi Gilboa F.C. players
Israeli Premier League players
Liga Leumit players
Association football forwards